Environiq Arena is the primary indoor sports and event arena in Kristinehamn, Sweden. Construction began in 2006.

Environiq Arena has been selected as a championship arena, event arena and exhibition hall. This arena is mainly an indoor football and indoor athletics events.

References

External links 

 
 Environiq – Official site
 IFK Ölme – Official site
 Kristinehamn Municipality – Official site

Indoor arenas in Sweden
Football venues in Sweden
Music venues in Sweden
Music venues completed in 2007
Sports venues completed in 2007
Sports venues in Sweden
Buildings and structures in Värmland County
2007 establishments in Sweden